Yolo County (Wintun: Yo-loy), officially the County of Yolo, is a county located in the northern portion of the U.S. state of California. As of the 2020 census, the population was 216,403. Its county seat is Woodland.

Yolo County is included in the Greater Sacramento metropolitan area and is located in the Sacramento Valley.

The majority of Yolo County remains a relatively rural agricultural region.

Etymology
In the original act of 1850 the name was spelled "Yola." Yolo is a Patwin Native American name variously believed to be a corruption of a tribal name Yo-loy meaning "a place abounding in rushes", the village of Yodoi, believed to be in the vicinity of Knights Landing, California, or the name of the chief of said village, Yodo.

History
Yolo County was one of the original counties of California, created in 1850 at the time of statehood.

Government
The county is governed by a board of five district supervisors as well as the governments of its four incorporated cities: Davis, West Sacramento, Winters, and Woodland.

Geography

Adjacent counties
 Colusa County - north
 Sutter County - northeast
 Sacramento County - east
 Solano County - south
 Napa County - west
 Lake County - northwest

Transportation

Major highways

County roads
Addressing in Yolo County is based on a system of numbered county roads. The numbering system works in the following way:
 North–South roads have numbers from 41 to 117 and increase from west to east.
 East–West roads have numbers from 1 to 38A, and then from 151 to 161, and increase from north to south.

Each integer road number is generally one mile (1.6 km) apart, with letters occasionally designating roads less than one mile (1.6 km) apart. County roads entering urban areas generally become named roads once they cross a city boundary. Some examples include County Road 101 in Woodland being renamed Pioneer Ave. and County Road 102 (also known as County Route E8) in Davis being named Pole Line Road.

Public transportation
 Yolobus (Yolo County Transportation District) runs buses throughout Yolo County and into Sacramento, and Sacramento International Airport.
 The University of California, Davis and the city of Davis jointly run Unitrans, a combination local city bus and campus shuttle.
 Fairfield-Suisun Transit Line 30 also stops in Davis on its runs between Fairfield (Solano County) and Sacramento.
 Amtrak has a station in Davis.

Airports
 Yolo County Airport
 University Airport
 Borges-Clarksburg Airport
 Watts-Woodland Airport

Port
The Port of Sacramento, now known as the Port of West Sacramento, is an inland port in West Sacramento, California, in the Sacramento metropolitan area.

Crime 

The following table includes the number of incidents reported and the rate per 1,000 persons for each type of offense.

Cities by population and crime rates

Politics
Yolo is a strongly Democratic county in presidential and congressional elections. The last Republican presidential candidate to win a majority in the county was Dwight Eisenhower in 1952, which is the longest Republican drought for any California county. In fact, since 1928, Eisenhower's win in 1952 was the only time the county was carried by the Republican presidential nominee.

  
  
  
  
  
  
  
  
  
  
  
  
  
  
  
  
  
  
  
  
  
  
  
  
  
  
  
  
  
  
  

Yolo County has been somewhat more likely to elect Republican governors since then (Ronald Reagan carried the county in 1966, George Deukmejian in 1986, and Arnold Schwarzenegger in 2003 and 2006).

In June 1978, Yolo was one of only three counties in the entire state to reject Proposition 13 (the others being San Francisco and Kern).

In November 2008, Yolo was one of just three counties in California's interior in which voters rejected Proposition 8 to ban gay marriage. Yolo voters rejected Proposition 8 by a vote of 58.65 percent to 41.35 percent. The other interior counties in which Proposition 8 failed to receive a majority of votes were Alpine County and Mono County.

Cities by population and voter registration

Demographics

2020 census

Note: the US Census treats Hispanic/Latino as an ethnic category. This table excludes Latinos from the racial categories and assigns them to a separate category. Hispanics/Latinos can be of any race.

2011

Places by population, race, and income

2010
The 2010 United States Census reported that Yolo County had a population of 200,849. The ethnic makeup of Yolo County was 126,883 (63.2%) White, 5,208 (2.6%) African American, 2,214 (1.1%) Native American, 26,052 (13.0%) Asian, 910 (0.5%) Pacific Islander, 27,882 (13.9%) from other races, and 11,700 (5.8%) from two or more races.  Hispanic or Latino of any race were 60,953 persons (30.3%).

2000
As of the census of 2000, there were 168,660 people, 59,375 households, and 37,465 families residing in the county. There were 61,587 housing units at an average density of 61 per square mile (23/km2). The ethnic makeup of the county was 67.7% White, 2.0% Black or African American, 1.2% Native American, 9.9% Asian, 0.3% Pacific Islander, 13.8% from other races, and 5.2% from two or more races.  25.9% of the population were Hispanic or Latino of any race. 10.0% were of German, 6.6% English and 6.4% Irish ancestry according to Census 2000. 68.5% spoke English, 19.5% Spanish, 2.1% Chinese or Mandarin and 1.8% Russian as their first language.

There were 59,375 households, out of which 33.6% had children under the age of 18 living with them, 47.6% were married couples living together, 11.1% had a female householder with no husband present, and 36.9% were non-families. 23.3% of all households were made up of individuals, and 7.3% had someone living alone who was 65 years of age or older.  The average household size was 2.71 and the average family size was 3.25.

In the county, the population was spread out, with 25.2% under the age of 18, 18.3% from 18 to 24, 28.2% from 25 to 44, 18.9% from 45 to 64, and 9.4% who were 65 years of age or older.  The median age was 30 years. For every 100 females, there were 95.6 males.  For every 100 females age 18 and over, there were 92.2 males.

The median income for a household in the county was $40,769, and the median income for a family was $51,623. Males had a median income of $38,022 versus $30,687 for females. The per capita income for the county was $19,365.  About 9.5% of families and 18.4% of the population were below the poverty line, including 16.0% of those under age 18 and 7.4% of those age 65 or over.

Education

Public schools
The county's public schools are managed by the Yolo County Office of Education.

Colleges and universities
 University of California, Davis
 Woodland Community College

Communities

Cities
 Davis
 West Sacramento
 Winters
 Woodland
 Madison

Census-designated places

 Brooks
 Clarksburg
 Dunnigan
 El Macero
 Esparto
 Guinda
 Knights Landing
 Monument Hills
 Rumsey
Tancred
 University of California-Davis
 Yolo

Other unincorporated communities

 Capay
 Plainfield
 Zamora

Population ranking

The population ranking of the following table is based on the 2010 census of Yolo County.

† county seat

See also

 1892 Vacaville–Winters earthquakes
 List of school districts in Yolo County, California
 National Register of Historic Places listings in Yolo County, California

Notes

References

External links

 
 Yolo County, California USENET FAQ
 Yolo County Visitors Bureau website
 Yolo County District Attorney
 Yolo County Community website
 Yolo County CAGenWeb Project (history & genealogy)
 Yolo County, Calif., map 185-? at The Bancroft Library

 
California counties
Sacramento Valley
Counties in the Sacramento metropolitan area
1850 establishments in California
Populated places established in 1850
Majority-minority counties in California